Katsunori (written: 勝紀, 克紀, 克典, 克則 or 克法) is a masculine Japanese given name. Notable people with the name include:

Katsunori Iketani (born 1953), Japanese racing driver
, Japanese mixed martial artist
, Bulgarian sumo wrestler
, Japanese golfer
, Japanese baseball player
, Japanese singer and actor
, Japanese footballer
, Japanese physicist
, Japanese Go player

Japanese masculine given names